Morning business are routine considerations and business that usually occurs during the first two hours of a legislative day in the United States Senate, after opening speeches by floor leaders. This may include the formal receipt of messages from the President of the United States and the House of Representatives, the introduction of bills, and other routine legislative tasks. Senators may also request to speak briefly on any topic which concerns them.

Although the name implies that routine business is exclusive to the morning, morning business can be carried out at any time during the legislative day via unanimous consent.

References

United States Senate